Helen is an unincorporated community in St. Mary's County, Maryland, United States and is located near Mechanicsville. It was the hometown of French Forrest.  The ZIP Code for Helen is 20635.

References

Unincorporated communities in St. Mary's County, Maryland
Unincorporated communities in Maryland